Metajna is a village in Croatia, in the municipality of Novalja, with a population of 236.
It is located in the Bay of Pag on the island of Pag.

The Slana concentration camp was about 5 km away from the village, which operated during the beginning of the World War II.

References

 Charon and Destinies
 Of Red Dragons and Evil Spirits
 The Slana Camp
 Slana
 Metajna By Bosko Breider

Populated places in Lika-Senj County
Pag (island)